The 1997 Rio de Janeiro motorcycle Grand Prix was the tenth round of the 1997 Grand Prix motorcycle racing season. It took place on 3 August 1997 at the Autódromo Internacional Nelson Piquet.

500 cc classification

250 cc classification

125 cc classification

References

Rio de Janeiro motorcycle Grand Prix
Rio de Janeiro
Rio de Janeiro Grand Prix